Dubuc is a provincial electoral district in the Saguenay–Lac-Saint-Jean region of Quebec, Canada that elects members to the National Assembly of Quebec. It notably includes part of the city of Saguenay as well as Saint-Honoré and Saint-Ambroise.

It was created for the 1966 election from parts of Chicoutimi and Jonquière-Kénogami electoral districts.

Members of the Legislative Assembly / National Assembly

Election results

|-
 
|Liberal
|Serge Simard
|align="right"|9,723
|align="right"|42.85
|align="right"|

|-

|Independent
|Fernand Bouchard
|align="right"|199
|align="right"|0.88
|align="right"|–
|-
|}

References

External links
Information
 Elections Quebec

Election results
 Election results (National Assembly)

Maps
 2011 map (PDF)
 2001 map (Flash)
2001–2011 changes (Flash)
1992–2001 changes (Flash)
 Electoral map of Saguenay–Lac-Saint-Jean region
 Quebec electoral map, 2011

Quebec provincial electoral districts
Politics of Saguenay, Quebec